The development of Cyberpunk 2077, an action role-playing video game, began following the release of The Witcher 3: Wild Hunt – Blood and Wine expansion in May 2016. CD Projekt published Cyberpunk 2077 in December 2020 for PlayStation 4, Stadia, Windows, and Xbox One, and in February 2022 for PlayStation 5 and Xbox Series X/S. Set in the Cyberpunk universe, its development was led by a 50-person team at CD Projekt Red, who partnered with several companies. The team quickly grew, surpassing the development team for The Witcher 3: Wild Hunt (2015).

In the game, players assume the role of V, a mercenary hired to steal a biochip. The heist fails, and V implants the biochip in their head; unbeknownst to V, the biochip contains a digital incarnation of a rock star and terrorist known as Johnny Silverhand, who had committed a thermonuclear attack on the Arasaka Corporation decades prior and had presumably died during the bombing. V must choose to try to take down the Arasaka Corporation or spare it, while the biochip attempts to overwrite their identity with Silverhand's. V is voiced by Gavin Drea or Cherami Leigh, depending on the gender the player chooses, while Silverhand is voiced by Keanu Reeves.

Cyberpunk 2077 features an original score from Polish composer Marcin Przybyłowicz, who previously composed The Witcher 3: Wild Hunt. The score, written by Przybyłowicz with the help of composers P. T. Adamczyk and Paul Leonard-Morgan, draws from genres such as rave and industrial music, juxtaposed with the themes of intelligent dance music present in the tracks. In addition to the original score, original music—written by licensed artists—is featured in the game through in-game radio stations.

Cyberpunk 2077 was highly anticipated upon its announcement in May 2012. In the years following its initial announcement, CD Projekt fervently promoted the game through press showings, trailers, marketing material, and special editions. Following multiple controversial delays in 2020, the game was released in December 2020. Upon its release, numerous performance and technical issues plagued the game, with its launch considered disastrous by multiple publications. Although well received by critics and a commercial success, the release of Cyberpunk 2077 was met with ridicule, leading to a class-action lawsuit being filed. The game was temporarily removed from the PlayStation Store for its technical issues on the PlayStation platforms, including claims that the game bricked players' systems.

Production

Preliminary work on Cyberpunk 2077 began following the release of The Witcher 2: Assassins of Kings Enhanced Edition (2012). CD Projekt Red—CD Projekt's internal development studio—approached Mike Pondsmith, the writer of Cyberpunk and founder of R. Talsorian Games, in early 2012, sending him a copy of The Witcher 2: Assassins of Kings (2011). Impressed with the studio's unparalleled knowledge of the Cyberpunk universe at the time, Pondsmith and CD Projekt Red reached an agreement to license Cyberpunks story from the year 2077 onward to CD Projekt Red, while Pondsmith retained the rights for media in the Cyberpunk universe set up until the year 2077. To ensure Cyberpunks story remained cohesive during development, Pondsmith served as a consultant on Cyberpunk 2077. Pondsmith's experience at Microsoft developing games such as Crimson Skies (2000) and Blood Wake (2001), and at Monolith Productions developing The Matrix Online (2005), provided valuable wisdom to CD Projekt Red, in comparison to Polish writer Andrzej Sapkowski's indifference towards the studio during the development of The Witcher (2007) and The Witcher 2.

Story and setting

The concept of Cyberpunk 2077 was adapted from Pondsmith's Cyberpunk series. Antithetical to the stereotypical cyberpunk genre, the concepts explored in Cyberpunk evoke a sense of rebellion and whimsy while retaining the genre's grim tone. The protagonist of Cyberpunk—in comparison to the typical archetype of a hero attempting to save the world—attempts to save himself, from a downtrodden and lowly perspective. Lead gameplay designer Marcin Janiszewski sought to remind players of its connection to the Cyberpunk universe, writing, "We want to assure fans of the pen-and-paper game that this is still the same Cyberpunk you know". In comparison to CD Projekt Red's development on The Witcher series, the time difference between the events of Cyberpunk and Cyberpunk 2077 allotted the studio more freedom towards adapting the series, although they attempted to stay true to Pondsmith's original works.

Cyberpunk 2077, by extension, presents an alternate history, in which the Soviet Union failed to dissolve and Japan became a superpower, diffusing its culture as far as California. The events of Cyberpunk 2077 take place in the fictitious Night City, a megalopolis immersed in Japanese culture that lies between Los Angeles and San Francisco. Stereotypical cyberpunk motifs, such as sadism, commercialization, and cruelty, and satisfaction, remain as mainstays in the political landscape of Night City. A hedonistic wonderland, Night City is divided into two distinct classes: the downtrodden, who use psychedelic substances and physically augmented sex workers as a form of escapism, while the elite corporate class (known as "corpos") dominate society and are afforded great financial success.

The script was first written in Polish and translated into English, a standard practice for CD Projekt games, according to quest director Mateusz Tomaszkiewicz.

Character development
V is voiced by Gavin Drea and Cherami Leigh for the male and female versions of V, respectively.

CD Projekt Red sought a suitable voice actor for the role of Johnny Silverhand. Keanu Reeves was approached in July 2018 for the role, and noted for his work as Neo in The Matrix franchise. Reeves' performance was recorded using motion capture technology, a process he had previously used for his performance as Neo in The Matrix (1999). Although a newcomer to the video game format, Reeves enjoyed the script. Silverhand is featured prominently in the game, with CD Projekt co-founder Marcin Iwiński recalling in an interview with Bloomberg News that Silverhand's dialogue count is second only to V.

Technical and gameplay development
Cyberpunk 2077 was developed using REDengine 4, the fourth iteration of CD Projekt Red's internal game engine. REDengine 3, REDengine 4's predecessor, implemented improvements to terrain and vegetation rendering. To achieve this, regions are streamed from a clipped mipmap (through a method known as clipmapping) in memory. Six clipmaps are created in total; the elevation, control map, and color clipmaps are streamed, while the vertical error, normal, and terrain shadow clipmaps are generated at runtime. In addition, a technique known as tessellation is used, where polygons are divided. In particular, polygon triangulation is used, where data is tessellated into triangles. The error maps are downsampled prior to hardware tessellation. This avoids costly computation, as large areas with high levels of tessellation aren't rendered. Furthermore, REDengine3 employs a radical approach to texturing; textures are painted using two textures: a background texture and an overlay texture. For slopes, the slope angle is computed and compared against a threshold value. Creating a thick cover on slopes was made possible through boosting the overlay texture when the vertex normal looked up; however, this presented complications in ground features, such as cobblestones, where improper distribution was applied. To address this, damping was added, along with blend sharpening. These measures created an ultimately low memory footprint. Other advancements made by REDengine 3 include refined animations, volumetric effects allowing for advanced rendering of particle effects, such as clouds, dynamic physics, and an advanced dialogue mimic system. These improvements allowed The Witcher 3: Wild Hunt to have a more immersive open-world.

Although Cyberpunk 2077 was initially developed using REDengine 3 as far back as 2013, CD Projekt Red developed REDengine 4 after facing difficulty developing the game, which used a first-person perspective, a departure from the third-person perspective CD Projekt had developed in for earlier iterations of REDengine. REDengine 4 was developed using a US$7 million grant from the Polish government. Nearly every aspect of REDengine was changed as a result, including the particle effects editor. CD Projekt Red continued to work on REDengine throughout Cyberpunk 2077s development cycle, and as late as 2017.  Cyberpunk 2077 is the final game to use REDengine, as future games from CD Projekt Red will instead be developed using Unreal Engine 5.

REDengine 4 implemented various lighting adjustments to create a more realistic world, including hardware-accelerated ray tracing through DirectX, global illumination, diffuse illumination, and ambient occlusion. These features are not present on the console versions of the game. Other features include physically based rendering—an improvement over REDengine 3, screen space reflections, and pin sharp reflections, although the player's character is omitted from the bounding volume hierarchy structure generated ray traced reflections. The player's character does appear, however, in render to texture objects, such as mirrors. Improvements to shadows include cascaded shadow maps, screen space shadows, and ray traced shadows with contact hardening, while improvements to character rendering include subsurface scattering and realistic skin shading. These features introduced computational complexity, testing older consoles, such as the PlayStation 4 and Xbox One. Cyberpunk 2077 uses vertical asset streaming, or culling, a rendering technique that omits objects below and above the player's field of view. This technique saves memory.

During the development of Cyberpunk 2077, CD Projekt Red partnered with several companies. These companies include Vancouver-based studio Digital Scapes to create additional tools, multinational technology company Nvidia to implement real-time ray tracing, developer QLOC for quality assurance. In addition, artificial intelligence company Jali Research helped CD Projekt Red implement lip syncing for all ten localizations through procedural generation.

CD Projekt Red used a first-person perspective to immerse the player further in the world and hone in on the megacorporation motif. To seamlessly blend cutscenes with gameplay, CD Projekt Red decided to frame cutscenes in first-person, including the sex scenes, with limited exceptions. Players can, however, drive in third-person, and the player's character is visible in areas such as mirrors and security cameras. The decision by game director Adam Badowski to include nudity was tactfully planned, with Badowski stating, "Nudity is important for us because of one reason. This is cyberpunk, so people augment their body. So the body is no longer sacrum [sacred]; it’s profanum [profane]", expanding upon transhumanist beliefs.

The quest team took several changes in comparison to the quest system in The Witcher 3: Wild Hunt (2015). Game logic was implemented to allow for players to undertake quests in seemingly random orders while remaining coherent, while doubling down on The Witcher 3 philosophy of a "quest twist". To reuse the stories written during the game's development, unused parts from the main story were turned into side quests.

Art design

When designing Night City, the art design team at CD Projekt Red took multiple sources of inspiration. German industrial designer Dieter Rams and American neo-futurist concept artist Syd Mead inspired the team, who used Rams' elegance to juxtapose the low-class neighborhoods in Night City and Mead's vibrant colors and materialism to create the demeanor of Night City, in what the team called "kitsch". Building these environments took the team eight years. To create a cyberpunk look for Night City, the team incorporated retro and futuristic elements. To accomplish this, the team looked at dilapidated or old-fashioned buildings—aspects of a familiar reality—with futurism. "For example, you could have a run down building with an old wooden door, but an LED light might be attached to that door, which could be a part of a high-tech security system," Hiroshi Sakakibara, Environment City Coordinator at CD Projekt Red, said during a Cyberpunk 2077 livestream at Tokyo Game Show 2020. A key source of inspiration for the team was Blade Runner (1982), which Sakakibara referred to as the "Bible of all cyberpunk". Other sources of inspiration for the team include the manga and anime series Ghost in the Shell, and other video games such as System Shock (1994) and the first part of Deus Ex (2000). To design the buildings in Night City, the team consulted with urban planners and drew upon the themes of Brutalist architecture. The game's yellow-themed design serves as the antithesis to typical neon art. The designs of Marcello Gandini helped shape the appearance of many of the cars in the game. A motorbike akin to the one in the Akira manga and anime film appears in the game, as well as a car inspired by Mad Max: Fury Road (2015).

To develop the world building in Night City, the team used four distinct visual styles—austere Entropism, colorful Kitsch, imposing Neomilitarism, and opulent Neokitsch—to explain what happened to the world prior to the events of the game. Bulky cars and unappealing buildings represent Entropism, an architectural style that came about through necessity. In Entropism, practicality is valued more than aesthetics. As the economy recovered, the vibrant style of Kitsch gained traction. The style of Kitsch was countered with Neomilitarism, an ascetic movement where the rise of corporations undid many of the stylistic decisions made in Entropism. Finally, Neokitsch incorporated the classist systems in Neomilitarism with the vibrance of Entropism. In Neokitsch, the rich use scarce materials, such as wood and marble, to construct their buildings, and wear clothes from animals. Night City features six districts, each with a unique gusto. Pacifica, for instance, was a prosperous vacation destination until an economic crisis hit, leaving the Haitian community to form a civilization around the buildings.

The team used the digital compositing software Nuke to design Night City. A challenge for the team was creating a global illumination system that would cast a variety of light sources on narrow streets. Nuke was used to analytically reference the lighting in REDengine with Nuke. In contrast to most other video games, which use tone-mapping, Cyberpunk 2077 uses a classic film LUT. In addition, Nuke was used to design the game's user interface and splash screen.

Music and sound production
Multiple licensed artists contributed to Cyberpunk 2077 soundtrack. Hip hop duo Run the Jewels, composed of rappers El-P and Killer Mike, wrote "No Save Point" for the game's soundtrack—a track that vividly critiques the socioeconomic state of Night City. The song is featured in the game and performed by El-P and Killer Mike as "Yankee and the Brave", a reference to the duo's fourth studio album, RTJ4 (2020). Other contributors include Canadian musician Grimes (as Lizzy Wizzy), Swedish band Refused (as Samurai), American rapper ASAP Rocky, English musician Gazelle Twin (as Trash Generation), and American musician Ilan Rubin, among others.

Business

Announcement
On May 30, 2012, CD Projekt officially announced a game set in the Cyberpunk universe, promising a non-linear, mature story with "advanced RPG mechanics". Mike Pondsmith, who wrote Cyberpunk and founded R. Talsorian Games, commented on licensing the game to CD Projekt:

In October 2012, CD Projekt announced that the game would be titled Cyberpunk 2077, during a GOG livestream.

Release

Cyberpunk 2077 was released on December 10, 2020, for PlayStation 4, Stadia, Windows, and Xbox One. Initial reviews highlighted the breadth and scale of Night City and the depth of side quests.

Technical issues 
The release of Cyberpunk 2077 was a high-profile event and was considered a disastrous launch by multiple publications as a result of the game suffering from numerous bugs and performance issues, particularly on the PlayStation 4 and Xbox One versions. The Guardian called the release "a shambles", while The New York Times called it "a high-profile flameout", with CD Projekt Red prominently failing to meet expectations for what was anticipated to be the biggest game release of the year. Other gaming industry commentators have described the post-launch reception of Cyberpunk 2077 as a fall from grace for CD Projekt Red, who had previously enjoyed a fiercely pro-consumer reputation.

Some of the initial reviews that had been based only on the PC version of the game were later updated to add a caveat about the notable difference in performance between this version and its console releases. Because of the game's performance on consoles, CD Projekt issued an apology, particularly for their pre-release secrecy regarding these versions, concluding that unsatisfied consumers could opt for refunds. This was initially followed by multiple reports of players unable to get said refund. CD Projekt Red later stated that they had no specific deals in place with either Microsoft or Sony to facilitate such an action; refunds are dealt with according to standard refund policies. On 17 December 2020, Sony announced that it would offer refunds to customers who had purchased Cyberpunk 2077 through the PlayStation Store and removed it from the store "until further notice"; once returned to the store in June 2021, the PlayStation Store warned users that "Users continue to experience performance issues with this game. Purchase for use on PS4 systems is not recommended." The Xbox One version of the game remained available for purchase from the online Microsoft store, albeit with a warning about the game's performance issues. Players who bought the game through the Microsoft store were also offered refunds. In the US, GameStop accepted returns of boxed versions of the game even if the box was opened, an exception to the store's usual refund policy.

Notes

References

Cyberpunk 2077
Development and release